Shri Vedanidhi Tirtha (died 1635), was a Hindu philosopher, scholar, theologian and saint. He served as the pontiff of Shri Uttaradi Math from 1631-1635. He was the seventeenth in succession from Madhvacharya.

Life
Most of the information about Vedanidhi Tirtha's life is derived from hagiography - Gurucaryā. Vedanidhi Tirtha was a close contemporary of Raghavendra Tirtha. According to Guruvavansha Mahakavya, Sri Raghavendra Swami when once he came to Vedanidhi Tirtha openly declared that Sita sameta Moola Rama was only in the Uttaradi Matha. During his last days he ordained Satyavrata Tirtha and declared him as the successor to the Peetha of Uttaradi Matha and also Instructed him that he in turn should ordain Kaulagi Raghupathacharya In course of time.

References

Bibliography

 

Madhva religious leaders
Uttaradi Math
Dvaita Vedanta
Dvaitin philosophers
Scholars from Karnataka
History of Karnataka